In biology, the Goodwin model describes negative feedback oscillators in cellular systems, for example, circadian rhythms or enzymatic regulation (such as lactose in bacteria).  The Goodwin model, though, shows no stable limit cycles.

limit cycles can exist, see references. But not in the original Goodwin model which only has two variables.

References

Biological models